Régine Pernoud (17 June 1909, Château-Chinon, Nièvre – 22 April 1998, Paris) was a French historian and archivist.

Career 
In 1929, she obtained a baccalauréat universitaire ès lettres (BA) at the University of Aix-en-Provence. She moved to Paris where she entered the École nationale des chartes which she left in 1933 with a diploma as an archivist-paleographer. In 1935, she was awarded a doctorate in medieval history from the Sorbonne. Having grown up in an impoverished family, she worked in various professions (including as a teacher, a coach, and an archivist) while completing her university studies and while waiting for a post in a museum. She later became curator at the Museum of Fine Arts, Reims, in 1947, at the Museum of the History of France in 1949, at the National Archives, and at the Centre of Joan of Arc (which she had founded in 1974 at the request of André Malraux).

She is known for writing extensively about Joan of Arc and the social standing of women in the Middle Ages (500 - 1500), e.g., on Robert of Arbrissel who in 1099 founded the double monastery - one with nuns, and one with monks -  of Fontevraud, where he put a nun, Petronille de Chemillé, who was 22 years of age, in charge. She primarily did the work of a medieval historian, though she also published several popular works. She was a founding member of the learned society, the Académie du Morvan, in 1967.

She is the aunt of Georges Pernoud, the presenter of the TV series Thalassa.

Awards
She received the Grand Prize of the City of Paris in 1978 and in 1997 the Académie Française awarded her for her lifetime's work.

Bibliography 
 Essai sur l'histoire du port de Marseille des origines à la fin du XIIIe, doctoral thesis presented to the Faculté des lettres de l'Université de Paris, 1935
 L'Unité française, PUF, 1944
 Lumière du Moyen Âge, Grasset, 1944
 Les villes marchandes aux XIVe et XVe siècles, impérialisme et capitalisme au Moyen-âge, La Table Ronde, 1948
 Vie et mort de Jeanne d'Arc; les témoignages du procès de réhabilitation 1450-1456, Hachette, 1953
 Les grandes époques de l'art en Occident, Ed. du Chêne, 1954
 Les Gaulois, Seuil, 1957
 Les Croisés, Hachette, 1959
 Un Chef d'État, Saint Louis de France, Gabalda et cie, 1960
 Histoire de la bourgeoisie en France; I. Des origines aux temps modernes; II. Les temps modernes, Seuil, 1960–1962
 Les Croisades, Julliard, 1960
De Jeanne d'Arc à Louis XIV; III. De la régence à 1848; IV. De 1848 à nos jours are by three other authors)
 Croyants et incroyants d'aujourd'hui, Cerf, 1962
 Jeanne d'Arc par elle-même et par ses témoins, Seuil, 1962
 Notre Dame de Paris, La Documentation française, 1963
 L'histoire des rois mages : selon l'Évangile de saint Matthieu, Trianon, 1964
 La Formation de la France, PUF, 1966
 Aliénor d'Aquitaine, Albin Michel, 1966
 Héloïse et Abélard, Albin Michel, 1967
 8 mai 1429, la libération d'Orléans, Gallimard, 1969
 L'histoire racontée à mes neveux, Stock, 1969 illustrated by René Follet
 Jeanne devant les Cauchons, Seuil, 1970
 Beauté du Moyen Âge, Gautier Languereau, 1971
 La Reine Blanche, Albin Michel, 1972
 Les Templiers, PUF, col. Que sais-je?, 1974
 Pour en finir avec le Moyen Âge, Seuil, 1977
 Les Hommes de la Croisade, Tallandier, 1977
 La Femme au temps des cathédrales, Stock, 1980
 Sources de l'art roman (avec Madeleine Pernoud), Berg international, 1980
 Jeanne d'Arc (avec Madeleine Pernoud), Seuil, 1981
 Christine de Pisan, Calmann-Lévy, 1982
 Le Tour de France médiéval : l'histoire buissonnière (avec Georges Pernoud), Stock, 1982
 La Plume et le parchemin, Denoël, 1983
 Jeanne et Thérèse, Seuil, 1984
 Les Saints au Moyen Âge : la sainteté d'hier est-elle pour aujourd'hui ?, Plon, 1984
 Saint Louis et le crépuscule de la féodalité, A. Michel, coll. L'homme et l'événement, 1985
 Le Moyen Âge pour quoi faire ? (with Raymond Delatouche and Jean Gimpel). Stock, 1986.
 Isambour : la reine captive, Stock, 1987
 Richard Cœur de Lion, Fayard (1988), republished by Le Grand Livre du Mois, 1995
 Jeanne d'Arc et la guerre de Cent ans, Denoël, 1990
 La Femme au temps des croisades, Stock, 1990
 La Vierge et les saints au Moyen âge, C. de Bartillat, coll. Esprits, 1991
 La spiritualité de Jeanne d'Arc, Mame, 1992
 Villa Paradis : souvenirs, Stock, 1992
 Hildegarde de Bingen : conscience inspirée du XIIe, le Grand livre du mois, 1994
 J'ai nom Jeanne la Pucelle, coll. Découvertes Gallimard (no. 198), Paris: Gallimard, 1994
 Réhabilitation de Jeanne d'Arc, reconquête de la France, Éd. du Rocher-J.-P. Bertrand, 1995
 Les Templiers, chevaliers du Christ, coll. Découvertes Gallimard (no. 260), Paris: Gallimard, 1995, reprint 2009
 Celui par qui la Gaule devint chrétienne, Gallimard jeunesse, 1996
 Jardins de monastères, Actes Sud, 1996
 Martin de Tours, Bayard-Centurion, 1996
 Saint Jérôme : père de la Bible (with Madeleine Pernoud), Éd. du Rocher, 1996
 Jeanne d'Arc, Napoléon : le paradoxe du biographe, Éd. du Rocher, 1997
 Histoire et lumière, Éd. du Cerf, 1998
 Visages de femmes au Moyen Âge, Zodiaque, 1998

References

Further reading

 
 
 

1909 births
1998 deaths
People from Nièvre
French medievalists
Women medievalists
French archivists
Female archivists
French palaeographers
French Roman Catholics
Commandeurs of the Ordre des Arts et des Lettres
Officiers of the Légion d'honneur
École Nationale des Chartes alumni
20th-century French historians
Winners of the Prix Broquette-Gonin (literature)
20th-century French women writers
French women historians